Gympie Hammers Rugby Union Club is a rugby union football club based located in Gympie, Queensland. The club currently play in the Sunshine Coast Rugby Union's Sunshine Coast Cup.

History 
The Gympie club was one of the clubs to contest the 1982 Sunshine Coast Rugby Union competition.

References

External links
 
 

Sunshine Coast Rugby Union
Sport in the Sunshine Coast, Queensland
Gympie
1982 establishments in Australia
Rugby clubs established in 1982